"Appletree" is a song recorded by American singer Erykah Badu for her debut studio album Baduizm (1997). The song was written by Badu and Robert Bradford. It was released as the fourth and final single from Baduizm on November 17, 1997, by Kedar Records and Universal Records.

Track listings and formats

Charts

Release history

References

Bibliography
 

1998 singles
Erykah Badu songs
Songs written by Erykah Badu
Motown singles